Eshmunazar II (Phoenician: 𐤀𐤔𐤌𐤍𐤏𐤆𐤓 , a theophoric name meaning 'Eshmun helps') was the Phoenician King of Sidon. He was the grandson of king Eshmunazar I, and a vassal king of the Achaemenid Empire. He reigned after his father Tabnit I on the throne of Sidon. He died at the premature age of 14, and was succeeded by his cousin Bodashtart. The king is known from his sarcophagus, decorated with two inscriptions in the Phoenician script. It is housed in the Louvre Museum.

Etymology 
Eshmunazar is the Latinized form of the Phoenician theophoric name , meaning "Eshmun helps".

Variable spellings include: ʾEšmunʿazor, ʾšmnʿzr, Achmounazar, Ashmounazar, Ashmunazar, Ashmunezer, Echmounazar, Echmounazor, Eschmoun-ʿEzer,  Eschmunazar, Eshmnʿzr, Eshmunazor, Esmounazar, Esmunasar, Esmunazar, Ešmunʿazor, Ešmunazar, Ešmunazor.

Chronology 
The absolute chronology of the Kings of Sidon from the dynasty of Eshmunazar I has been much discussed in the literature; traditionally placed in the course of the fifth century, inscriptions of this dynasty have been dated back to an earlier period on the basis of numismatic, historical and archaeological evidence. The most complete work addressing the dates of the reigns of these Sidonian kings is by the French historian Josette Elayi who shifted away from the use of biblical chronology. Elayi used all the available documentation of the time and included inscribed Tyrian seals and stamps excavated by the Lebanese archaeologist Maurice Chehab in 1972 from Jal el-Bahr, a neighborhood in the north of Tyre, Phoenician inscriptions discovered by the French archaeologist Maurice Dunand in Sidon in 1965, and the systematic study of Sidonian coins which were the first coins to bear minting dates in antiquity based on the years of reign of the Sidonian kings. Elayi placed the reigns of the descendants of Eshmunazar I between the middle and the end of the sixth century; according to her work Eshmunazar II reigned from 539 BC until his premature death 525 BC.

Historical context 

Sidon, which was a flourishing and independent Phoenician city-state, came under Mesopotamian occupation in the ninth century BC. The Assyrian king Ashurnasirpal II (883–859 BC) conquered the Lebanon mountain range and its coastal cities including Sidon.

In 705, the Sidonian king Luli joined forces with the Egyptians and Judah in an unsuccessful rebellion against Assyrian rule, but was forced to flee to Kition with the arrival of the Assyrian army headed by Sennacherib. Sennacherib instated Ittobaal on the throne of Sidon and reimposed the annual tribute. When Abdi-Milkutti ascended to Sidon's throne in 680 BC, he also rebelled against the Assyrians. In response, the Assyrian king Esarhaddon  captured and beheaded Abdi-Milkutti in 677 BC after a three-year siege; Sidon was stripped of its territory, which was awarded to Baal I, the king of rival Tyre and loyal vassal to Esarhaddon.

Sidon returned to its former prosperity while Tyre was besieged for 13 years (586–573 BC) by the Chaldean king Nebuchadnezzar II. After the Achaemenid conquest in 529 BC Phoenicia was divided into four vassal kingdoms: Sidon, Tyre, Byblos and Arwad. Eshmunazar I, a priest of Astarte and the founder of his namesake dynasty became king around the time of the Achaemenid conquest of the Levant.  During the first phase of Achaemenid rule Sidon flourished and reclaimed its former standing as Phoenicia's chief city, and the Sidonian kings began an extensive program of mass-scale construction projects attested in the Eshmunazar II sarcophagus and Bodashtart inscriptions.

Reign 
To date, all that we know of the king's reign has been learned from his funerary inscriptions.

Vassalage

Religiosity and temple building 

The kings of Sidon held priestly in addition to military, judiciary and diplomacy responsibilities. Among the Sidonian kings' various duties, priestly functions were given more importance as is highlighted by the place of the priestly title which preceded the royal title, and the patronym in the royal inscriptions of Eshmunazar I and Tabnit. The reverse of some of the locally minted coins show that the Sidonian kings were personally engaged in religious ceremonies.

Eshmunazar II descends from a line of priests; his father Tabnit and his grandfather Eshmunazar I were priests of Astarte, in addition to being Kings of Sidon, as recorded on Tabnit's sarcophagus inscriptions (known as KAI 13). Eshmunazar II's mother was also a priestess of Astarte as illustrated on line 14 of her son's sarcophagus inscriptions.  Temple building and renovation and the performance of priestly duties were promotional tools used to bolster the Sidonian monarchs' political power and magnificence by depicting them as pious, and the recipients of divine favor and protection; this royal function was materialized by Eshmunazar II and his mother Queen Amoashtart through the construction of new temples and religious buildings for the Phoenician gods Baal, Astarte, and Eshmun in a number of Sidon's neighborhoods and adjoining territory (see lines 15–18 of Eshmunazar II's sarcophagus inscriptions). Additionally, Eshmunazar II's sarcophagus inscription calls upon the gods to severely punish anyone who disturbs the deceased king's resting place.

Territorial expansion 
The Phoenician cities of the eastern coast of the Mediterranean consisted of an urban area, an agricultural territory in the perimeter of the urban center, and mountainous hinterlands. The agricultural territory of the Phoenician cities was intended originally to support the needs citizens; in the Neo-Assyrian era, an inscription from King Esarhaddon describing the city of Sidon listed the various localities, pastures, and irrigated land of the city's agricultural territory. The resources of this territory were no longer sufficient during the Persian domination to meet the needs of Sidon who sought territorial expansion. In recognition to Sidon's naval warfare contributions, the "Lord of Kings" awarded Eshmunazar II the territories of Dor, Joppa and the lands of Dagon which are in the plain of Sharon (lines 18–20 of the Eshmunazar II sarchophagus inscriptions).

The territories of the Phoenician cities could be discontinuous: thus, the lands and the cities of Dor and Joppa belonging to the Sidonians were separated from Sidon by the city of Tyre.

Succession and death 
Semitic royal titles of Phoenician regents reveal that Phoenician royalty was hereditary and that monarchs reigned for life. The responsibilities and power of the position were passed down to the regent's child or another member of their family when they die. The royal ancestry and lineage of Sidonian kings was documented up to the second or third-degree ancestor (see line 13 and 14 of Eshmunazar II's sarcophagus inscription); it was not necessarily done by order of primogeniture as is the case of Eshmunazar II's cousin and successor Bodashtart. Queen mothers held political power and exercised in the form of association with political acts and co-regency.

Eshmunazar II's father King Tabnit I ruled for a short time and died before the birth of his son, he was succeeded by his sister-wife Amoashtart who assumed the role of interregnum regent and ruled alone until Eshmunazar II's birth, and then acted as his regent until the time he would have reached majority. Eshmunazar II died aged 14 during the reign of his overlord the King of Kings Cambyses II of Achaemenid Persia.  After his premature death Eshmunazar II was succeeded by his cousin Bodashtart.

Genealogy 
Eshmunazar II was a descendant of Eshmunazar I's dynasty. Eshmunazar's heir was his son Tabnit, who fathered Eshmunazar II from his sister Amoashtart. Tabnit died before the birth of Eshmunazar II, and Amoashtart ruled in the interlude until the birth of her son, then was co-regent until he reached adulthood.

Eshmunazar II's sarcophagus 

The sarcophagus of Eshmunazar II was discovered on 19 January 1855 when treasure-hunters were digging in the grounds of an ancient cemetery in the plains south of the city of Sidon. It was found just outside of a hollowed-out rocky mound that's locally known as Magharet Abloun [The Cavern of Apollo], a part of a large complex of Achaemenid era necropoli. The discovery is attributed to Alphonse Durighello, an agent of the French consulate in Sidon, who informed and sold the sarcophagus to the chancellor of the French consulate in Beirut and amateur archaeologist Antoine-Aimé Peretié. The Egyptian-style black amphibolite anthropoid sarcophagus was first described, and the acquired by Honoré Théodoric d'Albert de Luynes, a French aristocrat and holder of an immense fortune; de Luynes who donated it to the French state. The sarcophagus of Eshmunazar II dates back to the 26th dynasty of Egypt (664–525 B.C.); it was originally made for the burial an unidentified Egyptian notable. Elayi posits that the sarcophagi were brought to Sidon before 525 BC and that they were seized by the Sidonians during their participation in Cambyses II's conquest of Egypt in 525 B.C. The sarcophagus of King Eshmunazar II is housed in the Louvre's Near Eastern antiquities section in room 311 of the Sully wing. It was given the museum identification number of AO 4806.

Inscriptions 
A long inscription of twenty two lines is carved on the surface of the sarcophagus lid. A second inscription was found on the trough of the sarcophagus. Additionally, the external surface of the trough bears an isolated group of two Phoenician characters. De Luynes believes that they to have been trial carving marks of the engraver of the inscription.

The inscriptions of the sarcophagus of Eshmunazar are known to scholars as KAI 14; they are written in the Phoenician Canaanite language, in the Phoenician alphabet. They identify the king buried inside, tell of his lineage and temple construction feats and warns against disturbing him in his repose.

The inscriptions also state that the "Lord of Kings" (the Achaemenid King of Kings, probably Cambyses II) granted the Sidonian king "Dor and Joppa, the mighty lands of Dagon, which are in the plain of Sharon" in recognition of his deeds.  The deeds in question probably relate to the contribution of Eshmanazar to the Egyptian campaign of Cambyses II.

Copies of the inscriptions were sent to scholars across the world and translations were published by well-known scholars of the time

English translation

See also 
 King of Sidon
 Karatepe bilingual

Notes

References

Bibliography

References

6th-century BC rulers in Asia
Kings of Sidon
Rulers in the Achaemenid Empire
6th-century BC Phoenician people